is a Japanese former competitive figure skater. She won two gold medals on the ISU Junior Grand Prix circuit and qualified for three ISU Junior Grand Prix Finals. She represented Japan at the 2005 World Junior Championships and the 2006 Four Continents Championships.

Programs

Competitive highlights

References

External links
 

1988 births
Japanese female single skaters
Sportspeople from Kyoto
Kansai University alumni
Living people